Heinrich Enea (born 18 December 1921) was a Romanian bobsledder. He competed in the two-man and the four-man events at the 1956 Winter Olympics.

References

External links
 

1921 births
Possibly living people
Romanian male bobsledders
Olympic bobsledders of Romania
Bobsledders at the 1956 Winter Olympics
Sportspeople from Bucharest